Khaja or Al Khaja is a surname. Notable people with the surname include: 

Anna Khaja, American actress and playwright
Mohamed Al Khaja (born 1980), Emirati diplomat
Nagieb Khaja (born 1979), Danish journalist
Nayla Al Khaja (born 1978), Emirati film writer, director and producer